Teyozwü Hill is a picturesque hill located in the western part of Viswema, Nagaland.

Some residents of Viswema gets refreshed just by the sight each morning even before their regular cup of morning tea. One can climb up this hill before dawn to catch up the beautiful sunrise.

Access
The hill can be reached by taking a diversion near the Dzüko Entry Point at the Viswema–Dzüko route and hiking over well marked trails. The trip from Viswema to the hill and back will generally take about 4 hours.

See also
 Dzüko Valley

References

Viswema
Hills of Nagaland